The Jalan Kastam Komuter station is a commuter train halt located in Port Klang, Selangor and served by the Port Klang Line of the KTM Komuter railway system. It was named as Pelabuhan Klang Pusat at the beginning.

The Jalan Kastam Komuter station was built to cater traffic in suburban area with the similar name called Jalan Kastam, located north-east from South point of Port Klang.

The KTM scrapyard and depot located beside the station is currently used to house old, broken down locomotives that will be sent for scrapping.

Now, the station will also interchange with future MRL East Coast Rail Link Phase 2 and would be the terminal station for passenger service.

External links
 Jalan Kastam KTM Komuter Station

Railway stations in Selangor
Rapid transit stations in Selangor
Port Klang Line